Pseudococculinidae is a family of small sea snails or false limpets, marine gastropod mollusks in the superfamily Lepetelloidea (according to the taxonomy of the Gastropoda by Bouchet & Rocroi, 2005).

This family has no subfamilies. The species in this family are hermaphroditic. They can be found from sublittoral to  hadal  depths.

Description
The shells are small (less than 6 mm), thin and translucent. Its microscopic sculpture is smooth with fine threads. The asymmetrical radula shows a broad, rachidian  tooth that lacks a cusp, four inner lateral teeth, a large  pluricuspid tooth, and numerous marginal teeth.

Soft body: the right tentacle is generally modified into a copulatory organ.

Genera 
Genera in the family Pseudococculinidae include:
 Amphiplica Haszprunar, 1988
 Bandabyssia Moskalev, 1976
 Copulabyssia Haszprunar, 1988
 Kaiparapelta B.A. Marshall, 1986
 Kurilabyssia Moskalev, 1976
 Mesopelex B.A. Marshall, 1986
 Notocrater Finlay, 1926
 Pseudococculina Schepman, 1908
 Punctabyssia McLean, 1991
 Tentaoculus Moskalev, 1976
 Yaquinabyssia Haszprunar, 1988
Synonyms
 Subfamily Caymanabyssiinae B. A. Marshall, 1986 Caymanabyssiidae B. A. Marshall, 1986 (original rank)
 Punctolepeta Habe, 1958 Notocrater Finlay, 1926

References 

 Marshall B.A. (1986 ["1985"]) Recent and Tertiary Cocculinidae and Pseudococculinidae (Mollusca: Gastropoda) from New Zealand and New South Wales. New Zealand Journal of Zoology 12: 505-546.

External links